2wo, or Two, is an English industrial metal band.

2wo may also refer to:

2WO, a 1985 album by Strange Advance
2wo:Thirteen or Two:Thirteen, a 2009 American thriller film

See also
2wo Third3, a 1990s British electropop group